Kastaniani ( meaning "chestnut tree") is a mountain village in the Ioannina regional unit in northern Greece. It is part of the municipal unit of Mastorochoria. It is situated in the northern Pindus mountains, near the left bank of the river Sarantaporos. It is 4 km southeast of Pyrsogianni and 18 km northeast of Konitsa. In 2011 its population was 79.

Population

See also
List of settlements in the Ioannina regional unit

External links
Kastania at the GTP Travel Pages

References

Populated places in Ioannina (regional unit)